Garden House School is a co-educational day private school located in Chelsea in the Royal Borough of Kensington and Chelsea in London, England, consisting of two major preparatory schools, two pre-prep schools and a Kindergarten. The girls' and boys' schools are separately taught within the same building, but share extra-curricular activities. Children are educated from the ages of three to eleven, but many boys transfer to other preparatory schools from the age of eight. Garden House School is reported to send a larger proportion of girls to leading boarding schools than other pre-preps in London. The school also has locations in the US, in New York's New York City and Briarcliff Manor.

The school shares its garden with the historic grounds of the Royal Hospital Chelsea, and occupies the Cavalry House, part of the Duke of York's Headquarters on Turks Row, which is a Grade II Listed Building.

History
Garden House School was founded in 1951 by a former gardener, Margery de Brissac Bernard, (1896–1994), as a single pre-preparatory school. It was based in Sloane Gardens and Pont Street in Chelsea. During the following twenty years, the school educated the children and grand-children of diplomats and Prime Ministers including Winston Churchill and Alec Douglas-Home. In 1973, a parent and teaching assistant, Mrs Jillian Oddy, took over the school, expanding its range to include a Kindergarten and two major pre-prep and prep schools, and by creating two new pre-schools in the United States, one in New York City and another in Briarcliff Manor, New York.

In 2004, the school moved into a single, purpose-designed building in the south side of the new Duke of York's development. Boys and girls continued to be taught separately, but now shared the facilities of a single building.

Academic record
Besides the regular National Curriculum subjects, girls and boys are taught a wide range of subjects. They are educated separately, but participate together in a variety of extracurricular activities.

The 2005 ISI Inspection Report commends the school for its pupils’ results in national tests at the age of 11 as "far above the national average for English and mathematics and well above the average in science", and that "the very good quality of pupils’ learning, attitudes to their work and their very good behaviour are major strengths of the school", but warned there was scope for improvement in several areas, whilst its 2011 report states that "Throughout the school, the quality of the pupils’ achievements is excellent. This is a significant improvement since the previous inspection", and that "Pupils are articulate, expressing themselves clearly in both oral and written tasks, and they listen carefully to their teachers and to one another. They apply their excellent language and mathematical skills with confidence across the curriculum".

See also
 List of independent schools in England

References

1951 establishments in England
Briarcliff Manor, New York
Educational institutions established in 1951
Private co-educational schools in London
Private schools in the Royal Borough of Kensington and Chelsea
Preparatory schools in London